Willow Springs is a station on Metra's Heritage Corridor in Willow Springs, Illinois. In Metra's zone-based fare system, Willow Springs is in zone D. As of 2018, Willow Springs is the 170th busiest of Metra's 236 non-downtown stations, with an average of 148 weekday boardings.

The tracks run parallel to both the Illinois and Michigan Canal and the Chicago Sanitary and Ship Canal. They also run along a former Chicago and Alton Railroad line, and shares the right-of-way with Amtrak's Lincoln Service and Texas Eagle trains, however, no Amtrak trains stop here.

As of 2022, Willow Springs is served by three inbound trains in the morning and three outbound trains in the evening on weekdays only.

Though Metra gives the address to the station as being at 87th Street and Archer Avenue, the actual location is along Willow Boulevard beneath the Gilbert Avenue Bridge. The current station is on the east side below this bridge. Parking is available on the west side of the bridge.

References

External links 

Station from Willow Springs Road from Google Maps Street View

Metra stations in Illinois
Railway stations in Cook County, Illinois
Railway stations in the United States opened in 1870